The 1928 Bluefield Big Blue football team was an American football team that represented the Bluefield Institute (now known as Bluefield State College) during the 1928 college football season. In its fourth season under head coach Harry R. Jefferson, the team compiled an 8–0–1 record. Bluefield was the defending 1927 black college national champion, became known as the "Wonder Team", and was again recognized as the 1928 black college national champion. The team played its home games in the Beceye Bowl in Bluefield, West Virginia.

Key players included tackle Ted Gallion and quarterback Herbert Cain. Jimmy Moore was the assistant coach.

Schedule

References

Bluefield
Bluefield State Big Blues football seasons
Black college football national champions
College football undefeated seasons
Bluefield Big Blue football